The Dudhnoi River is a sub-tributary of the Brahmaputra River in the Indian state of Assam. The Dudhnoi river originates in the East Garo Hills of Meghalaya. The Dudhnoi River meets Krishnai River at Matia of Goalpara district and then flows as Mornoi River before its confluence with the Brahmaputra river. Floods in Goalpara district is dictated by the Dudhnoi river.

References 

Rivers of Assam
Rivers of India